Creature was an advertising agency founded in 2002 with offices in Seattle, Washington.

History

Creature opened an office in London in 2011 which was considered a separate entity.

The company filed for bankruptcy in 2016.

References 

Marketing companies established in 2002
Advertising agencies of the United States
Companies based in Seattle
American companies disestablished in 2016
American companies established in 2002